The Derby Greenway is a 2.05 mile long multipurpose trail located on the west side of Derby, Connecticut along the Naugatuck and Housatonic Rivers. The Greenway is part of the Naugatuck River Greenway Trail System, a proposed 44 mile multipurpose trail that follows the Naugatuck River from Torrington to Derby. The Derby section of the Naugatuck River Greenway System is the second-busiest multipurpose trail in Connecticut (behind the Bluff Point State Park trail) with 217,163 trips counted in 2021.

History 
Construction broke ground in June 2005 and was completed in three stages, 2006, 2008, 2013 respectively.

References 

Greenways
Hiking trails in Connecticut
Derby, Connecticut